Ibrahim Ismail Muftah Faraj (born 10 May 1972, in Doha) is a retired Qatari sprinter who competed mainly in the 400 metres. His personal best results are 20.96 seconds (200 m) and 44.66 seconds.

Competition record

1Representing Asia

References

External links

1972 births
Living people
Qatari male sprinters
Athletes (track and field) at the 1992 Summer Olympics
Athletes (track and field) at the 1996 Summer Olympics
Athletes (track and field) at the 2000 Summer Olympics
Olympic athletes of Qatar
Asian Games medalists in athletics (track and field)
Athletes (track and field) at the 1990 Asian Games
Athletes (track and field) at the 1994 Asian Games
Athletes (track and field) at the 1998 Asian Games
People from Doha
Asian Games gold medalists for Qatar
Asian Games silver medalists for Qatar
Asian Games bronze medalists for Qatar
Medalists at the 1990 Asian Games
Medalists at the 1994 Asian Games
Medalists at the 1998 Asian Games